Darqad is a village and jamoat in Tajikistan. It is located in Farkhor District in Khatlon Region. The jamoat has a total population of 14,503 (2015).

References

Populated places in Khatlon Region
Jamoats of Tajikistan